The seventh season of the American television series The Flash, which is based on the DC Comics character Barry Allen / Flash, premiered on The CW on March 2, 2021. The season follows Barry trying to stop Eva McCulloch and finding a way to locate his missing wife Iris West-Allen, and facing the consequences of the resurrection of the speed force and the ensuing Godspeed war. It is set in the Arrowverse, sharing continuity with the other television series of the universe, and is a spin-off of Arrow. The season is produced by Berlanti Productions, Warner Bros. Television, and DC Entertainment, with Eric Wallace serving as showrunner.

The season was ordered on January 7, 2020. Production began that October and concluded the following May. Grant Gustin stars as Barry, with principal cast members Candice Patton, Danielle Panabaker, Carlos Valdes, Danielle Nicolet, Efrat Dor, Tom Cavanagh, and Jesse L. Martin also returning from previous seasons, while Kayla Compton and Brandon McKnight were promoted to series regulars from their recurring and guest status in season six. This is the last season to feature Valdes and Cavanagh as series regulars. The series was renewed for an eighth season on February 3, 2021, which premiered on November 16, 2021.

Episodes 

Season seven is broken into two "Graphic Novel" storyline arcs, known as the third and fourth graphic novel respectively; this numbering continues from the first two "Graphic Novels" established in season six. The first three episodes of the season conclude the second "Graphic Novel" that began in and was supposed to end in season six.

Cast and characters

Main 
 Grant Gustin as Barry Allen / The Flash
 Candice Patton as Iris West-Allen
 Danielle Panabaker as Caitlin Snow and Frost
 Carlos Valdes as Cisco Ramon / Mecha-Vibe
 Danielle Nicolet as Cecile Horton
 Kayla Compton as Allegra Garcia
 Brandon McKnight as Chester P. Runk
 Efrat Dor as Eva McCulloch and Mirror Monarch
 Tom Cavanagh as Nash Wells, Harrison Wells, and Eobard Thawne / Reverse-Flash
 Jesse L. Martin as Joe West

Recurring 
 Victoria Park as Kamilla Hwang
 Stephanie Izsak as Daisy Korber
 Michelle Harrison as "Nora Allen" / Speed Force and Joan Williams
 Sara Garcia as Alexa Rivera / Fuerza
 Ennis Esmer as Bashir Malik / Psych
 Christian Magby as Deon Owens
 Carmen Moore as Kristen Kramer
 Jon Cor as Mark Blaine / Chillblaine
 Jessica Parker Kennedy as Nora West-Allen / XS

Guest

Production

Development 
On January 7, 2020, The CW renewed the series for a seventh season. At San Diego Comic-Con 2019, series star Grant Gustin implied it could be the final season as none of the actors were contracted for beyond seven seasons. However, the show was later renewed by The CW on February 3, 2021, confirming that it would continue with at least an eighth season.

Writing 
The sixth season ended prematurely, with 19 episodes out of the scheduled 22 due to the COVID-19 pandemic. Showrunner Eric Wallace said the remaining three episodes, which had been written, would become the first three episodes of season seven. He conceded there may be a few small adjustments made based on how the pandemic would affect shooting, but said Eva McCulloch's story "is on a very specific trajectory that we want to honor and finish." Wallace continued that he thought having these three episodes start season seven was "making it stronger because it's forcing us to look at these two separate things – which is the end of Eva's story and the beginning of the next villain's story and how he relates to Barry and Iris —" and making a strong connection between them. While cast member Danielle Panabaker was initially written out of some episodes in the season to accommodate her maternity leave since she gave birth in April 2020, Wallace said there had been discussions about whether to write her back into them since the pandemic resulted in production delays, though he noted the rewriting process was "tricky". Like the sixth season, the seventh season would be divided into multiple "Graphic Novel" arcs, though Wallace said they were "not going to be broken up in the way I think folks ." The "Graphic Novels" are known as the third and fourth graphic novels, continuing from season six. Wallace said all four would be connected as he was planning to tell "one big story" over season six and seven. "Reflections and Lies", the second "Graphic Novel" of season six, ends with the third episode of season seven.

Regarding the character of Ralph Dibny / Elongated Man, given actor Hartley Sawyer's firing from the show, Wallace said they would be giving the character "a rest for while. But we will leave the door open" for a version of the character to appear again. Given Dibny's powers allow him to alter his appearance, Wallave stated that it created "a couple of ways" for Dibny to "still appear in at least one episode this season to wrap that storyline up, that gets us what we need and still allows fans to say goodbye to the character, at least for the indefinite future." Wallace also revealed they had a planned storyline for Dibny with another character that would have tied into the season's main villain. As a result, another character was utilized for that storyline and Wallace said "the storyline became so much stronger" because it became more of an emotional journey for them, going "somewhere that we never imagined they would until many seasons down the line". Despite setting up the relationship between Dibny and Sue Dearbon, Dearbon would still appear in the season, assisting Team Flash "in an unexpected way". Wallace later said that Joe West's storyline in the season would be "inspired by societal changes happening in today's world".

Casting 

Main cast members Grant Gustin, Candice Patton, Danielle Panabaker, Carlos Valdes, Danielle Nicolet, Efrat Dor and Jesse L. Martin return as Barry Allen / The Flash, Iris West-Allen, Caitlin Snow / Frost, Cisco Ramon, Cecile Horton, Eva McCulloch, and Joe West. Tom Cavanagh, in addition to returning as Nash Wells, also plays Harry Wells, H. R. Wells, Sherloque Wells, Earth-1 Wells and Eobard Thawne / Reverse-Flash. Brandon McKnight, who plays Chester P. Runk, was promoted to the main cast on March 3, 2020, while Kayla Compton, who plays Allegra Garcia, was promoted to the main cast two days later, on March 5, 2020. Hartley Sawyer was expected to return as Ralph Dibny / Elongated Man in the season, but on June 8, 2020, he was fired from the series after his past social media posts with racist and misogynistic references resurfaced in the wake of the George Floyd protests. Sawyer's character eventually made his appearance in the third episode "Mother", portrayed by an uncredited actor. On December 1, 2020, David Ramsey was revealed to be reprising his Arrow role of John Diggle in the season. On January 13, 2021, Jon Cor was cast in a guest role as Mark Stevens / Chillblaine for the seventh season. On March 30, 2021, Jordan Fisher was cast in a recurring role as Bart Allen / Impulse. On May 4, 2021, it was announced that Cavanagh and Valdes would leave the series after the season concludes. It was originally planned for Cavanagh to leave after season six, but he remained to properly conclude his characters' storyline in the seventh season's first three episodes; he is credited as a special guest star for his later appearances. In the same month, it was revealed that Jessica Parker Kennedy and John Wesley Shipp would be reprising their roles as Nora West-Allen / XS and Jay Garrick.

Filming 
The episode that would have been season six's 20th was 90% filmed before being announced as the season seven premiere. The season was scheduled to begin filming on October 1, 2020. However, by September 29, the start of filming was indefinitely delayed because of delays in receiving COVID-19 test results for the cast and crew. Filming eventually began on October 9. On November 29, filming was suspended following a member of the production testing positive for COVID-19, and resumed by mid-December at Cloverdale. Filming concluded on May 22, 2021.

Marketing 
In early August 2020, The CW released several posters of the Arrowverse superheroes wearing face masks, including the Flash, with all posters having the caption "Real Heroes Wear Masks". This marketing tactic was used to "raise public awareness on the efficacy of facial coverings preventing the spread of COVID-19." In  early December 2020, the titles for the first five episodes of the season were revealed.

Release

Broadcast
The seventh season premiered on March 2, 2021, delayed from its previous date of February 23, 2021. Despite premiering much later than previous seasons, it was not expected to have a much shorter episode count. In September 2020, Wallace said the number of episodes for the season had not yet been decided, and that would depend on when the season would begin filming safely. On May 25, 2021, it was confirmed that the season 7 finale would be on July 20, and that the season would have only 18 episodes.

Reception

Ratings

Accolades 

|-
! scope="row" rowspan="1" | 2021
| People's Choice Awards
| data-sort-value="Sci-Fi/Fantasy Show of 2020, The"| The Sci-Fi/Fantasy Show of 2021
| data-sort-value="Flash, The"| The Flash
| 
| 
|-
|}

Notes

References

External links 
 

2021 American television seasons
The Flash (2014 TV series) seasons
Television productions postponed due to the COVID-19 pandemic
Television productions suspended due to the COVID-19 pandemic